Sören Johansson (born July 11, 1954) is a retired Swedish ice hockey player. Johansson began playing hockey in Ösmo IF, where he played until the 1971–72 season when he moved to Hammarby IF. He only stayed in Hammarby for one season before moving to Stockholm rival Djurgårdens IF. Johansson became the first Djurgården player to be drafted in a NHL draft. This happened when he was drafted by the Kansas City Scouts in the 11th round, 177th overall, in the 1974 NHL amateur draft. He was also the third Swede be drafted overall. Johansson played a total of nine seasons for Djurgården before returning to Hammarby for the 1981–82 season. He played there until his retirement from elite level hockey in Swedish in 1983.

Regular season and playoffs

References

External links

1954 births
Living people
Swedish ice hockey right wingers
Djurgårdens IF Hockey players
Kansas City Scouts draft picks